was a  coming after Keichō and before Kan'ei. This period spanned the years from July 1615 to February 1624.

Change of era
The old era ended and a new one commenced in Keichō 20.

The siege of Osaka was a series of battles undertaken by the Tokugawa shogunate against the Toyotomi clan, and ending in that clan's destruction. Divided into two stages (the "Winter Campaign" and the "Summer Campaign"), and lasting from 1614 through 1615, the siege put an end to the last major armed opposition to the establishment of an enduring Tokugawa shogunate. The end of this period of fighting is also sometimes called the  because the era name was changed from Keichō to Genna immediately following its ultimate resolution.

By order of Tokugawa Ieyasu, the era name of Emperor Xianzong of Tang China was adopted.

Events of the Genna era
 1615 (Genna 1): Tokugawa Ieyasu and his son, Shōgun Hidetada, marched again to Osaka Castle, which was captured and burned; but Hideyori managed to flee to Satsuma where he had prepared a refuge in advance.
 September 1, 1615 (Genna 1, 9th day of the 7th month): Ieyasu pulled down Hōkoku-jinja.
 September 20, 1615 (Genna 1, 28th day of the 7th month): Ieyasu promulgated the Genna-rei in 17 clauses.
 June 1, 1616 (Genna 2, 17th day of the 4th month): Ieyasu died at Suruga.
 September 25, 1617 (Genna 3, 26th day of the 8th month): Former-Emperor Go-Yōzei died. He is buried at Nikkō.
 1618 (Genna 4, 8th month): A comet appeared in the sky.
 July 5, 1620 (Genna 6, 6th day of the 6th month): The emperor was married to Tokugawa Kazuko, the daughter of Shōgun Hidetada; and also in that year.
 1620 (Genna 6): There were severe fires in Mikayo on the 30th day of the 2nd month and on the 4th day of the 3rd month.
 September 6, 1623 (Genna 9, 12th day of the 8th month): the bakufu raised the Imperial maintenance allowance by 10,000 koku.
 1623 (Genna 9): Tokugawa Iemitsu, son of Hidetada, came to the court of the emperor where he was created Shōgun.

Notes

References
 Nussbaum, Louis Frédéric and Käthe Roth. (2005). Japan Encyclopedia. Cambridge: Harvard University Press. ; OCLC 48943301
 Ponsonby-Fane, Richard Arthur Brabazon. (1956). Kyoto: The Old Capital of Japan, 794–1869. Kyoto: Ponsonby Memorial Society. 
 Screech, Timon. (2006). Secret Memoirs of the Shoguns: Isaac Titsingh and Japan, 1779-1822. London: RoutledgeCurzon. ; OCLC 65177072
 Titsingh, Isaac. (1834). Nihon Ōdai Ichiran; ou,  Annales des empereurs du Japon.  Paris: Royal Asiatic Society, Oriental Translation Fund of Great Britain and Ireland. OCLC 5850691.

External links
 National Diet Library, "The Japanese Calendar" -- historical overview plus illustrative images from library's collection

Japanese eras
1610s in Japan
1620s in Japan